.sn is the Internet country code top-level domain (ccTLD) for Senegal.

The following 2nd level domains are available for third-level domain name registration:
 art.sn
 com.sn
 edu.sn
 gouv.sn
 org.sn
 perso.sn
 univ.sn

External links
 IANA .sn whois information
 .sn domain registration website

Country code top-level domains
Telecommunications in Senegal
Computer-related introductions in 1993

sv:Toppdomän#S